Carljohan Eriksson (born 25 April 1995) is a Finnish footballer who plays for Danish club FC Nordsjælland, on loan from Scottish Premiership side Dundee United.

Career

He is a former youth talent of HJK of Helsinki. In addition to HJK, he has played two matches for PK-35 of Vantaa on loan. He has also represented Finnish national team on different youth levels. He made his debut in the highest level of Finnish football, Veikkausliiga, in August 2014.

After his spell in HJK, he transferred to the local rival team HIFK in 2015. His personal motivation for the transfer was to gain more appearances in HIFK.

On 6 January 2022, Eriksson signed with Scottish Premiership side Dundee United on a two-and-a-half year deal, subject to work permit. On 22 January 2023, Eriksson was loaned out to Danish Superliga side FC Nordsjælland until the end of the season.

International career

Eriksson was called up for the UEFA Euro 2020 pre-tournament friendly match against Sweden on 29 May 2021. He made his debut for Finland on 1 September 2021 in a friendly against Wales, keeping a clean sheet in a 0–0 draw at home.

Honours

Individual
 Allsvenskan: Goalkeeper of the year (2021)

References

External links

1995 births
Living people
Finnish footballers
Finnish expatriate footballers
Footballers from Helsinki
21st-century Finnish people
Association football goalkeepers
Finland youth international footballers
Finland under-21 international footballers
Finland international footballers
Swedish-speaking Finns
HIFK Fotboll players
Jönköpings Södra IF players
Mjällby AIF players
Klubi 04 players
Dundee United F.C. players
FC Nordsjælland players
Veikkausliiga players
Superettan players
Allsvenskan players
Scottish Professional Football League players
Finnish expatriate sportspeople in Sweden
Finnish expatriate sportspeople in Scotland
Finnish expatriate sportspeople in Denmark
Expatriate footballers in Sweden
Expatriate footballers in Scotland
Expatriate men's footballers in Denmark